Abdülkerim Nadir Pasha (1807–1883), also known as Çırpanlı Abdi Pasha or Abdul Kerim Pasha, son of Ahmed Ağa, was an Ottoman military commander, born in Chirpan, Ottoman Bulgaria.

Career 
He graduated from the military academy in Constantinople and was sent to Vienna to continue his education (1836–1841). He was the commander of the Ottoman forces based in eastern Anatolia during the Crimean War where he led many assaults against the Russian forces based in Gyumri. He assumed the command of the fortress at Kars and won the Battle of Bayandir. However, he was isolated from the court in Constantinople, and due to plotting by his well-connected subordinate, Ahmed Pasha, he was blamed for one of Ahmed Pasha's military failures.  Subsequently,  in January 1854, Abdülkerim Nadir Pasha was discharged from his position and replaced by the same Ahmed Pasha. After the war he was appointed as the governor of Thessaloniki.

He was elected to the constitutional parliament in 1876 as a senator, though he retained his position in the army and dealt with several riots in Serbia in 1877. Because of his success in dealing with these riots, he was appointed as the commander of a division of the Danube forces during the Russo-Turkish War. After several command failures in this war, he was court martialed and exiled to the island of Rhodes, where he died.

Notes

External links
Abdülkerim Nadir Pasha in the Turkish History
Official website of the Turkish History Association

1807 births
Pashas
Ottoman Army generals
Ottoman military personnel of the Crimean War
1883 deaths
19th-century Ottoman military personnel
People from Chirpan
Serbian–Turkish Wars (1876–1878)
Members of the Senate of the Ottoman Empire